The Intercity Experimental, later renamed ICE V, was an experimental train developed by the Deutsche Bundesbahn for research into high-speed rail in Germany. It is the predecessor of all Intercity Express trains of the Deutsche Bahn.

Design
The trainset was built with two Class 410 power cars built jointly by Krupp, Krauss-Maffei and Thyssen-Henschel, and up to three Class 810 intermediate coaches, of which two were built by Messerschmitt-Bölkow-Blohm and one by Duewag and Linke-Hofmann-Busch. When one of the coaches was used for measurement purposes, the other two were used for demonstration of a modern high-speed train. The powercars weighed 78 tons each and had a maximum output of 3,640 kW. They were mostly based on the DB Class 120 locomotives developed earlier, but had been equipped with an aerodynamic outer hull and a corporate identity livery. In the summer of 1986, one of the coaches (810 001) was refurbished from a measurement coach to a demonstration coach.

After a derailment on 3 September 1986, one of the power cars was not available for service. For a period of 10 months, one of the coaches was temporarily refit with a driver's cab in order to avoid further stalling of project schedules of the experimental project.

History

Background
The German Federal Ministry of Education and Research in 1968 commissioned a study on the technical and economic feasibility of high-speed rail transport in Germany. The results, published in 1971, showed a necessity for higher speeds in the German railways. In 1972, the ministry took the lead in developing new railway technologies. During the same time, a working group for "Rail/Wheel" was initiated in the Bundesbahn Central Offices in Minden. Initially, they concentrated on research regarding the Maglev project Transrapid that eventually led to the Emsland test facility.

The Bundesbahn was then more skeptical about the Maglev technology, and forced, from their side, more research into high-speed rail using conventional rail-wheel technologies. During the test runs a lot of knowledge was gained about the effects of high-speed rail.

In the beginning of 1974, the industry, along with the Deutsche Bundesbahn set up a "Community Office" (Gemeinschaftsbüro) for the development of a  train. More than 30 concept variations of a high-speed train were studied, particularly having the costs per person-kilometer in consideration. The selection was then narrowed down to 10 variations, and the initial results were presented in 1975. A test locomotive of  power and the capability to reach  was also suggested to be built, but was not realised due to cost restrictions. A draft of a train capable of reaching  for 200 to 600 passengers was put forth by the company Messerschmitt-Bölkow-Blohm in 1978, but was not realised as well.

In 1975, the Bundesbahn, the industry and research communities agreed on a three-step research strategy. Building on the research conducted in the first step, the second step should involve testing of the research. A planned national transport test facility in the second half of the 1970s did not, however, materialise.

The newly founded Forschungsgemeinschaft Rad/Schiene (Rail-wheel research community) from the industry, universities, and the railways took up works towards a conventional test train, this time with the perspective of user- and passenger-friendliness. On 19 December 1979, the group introduced the first prototype, called the Versuchsfahrzeug 1 (test train 1). By the middle of 1980, a three-part train capable of reaching  was developed, and the name Versuchsfahrzeug 2 (test train 2) was used. This was to be tested in the then-under-construction railway test facility Rheine-Feren, between the towns of Rheine and Freren. After the dry tests of the test train 1 in the early 1980s, preparations for a new prototype began, now named as the Rad/Schiene-Versuchs- und -Demonstrationsfahrzeug (Rail-wheel test and demonstration power train) (R/S-VD). In August 1982, the Deutsche Bundesbahn decided to invest 12 Million Deutsche Mark (DM) in the R/S-VD project, and changed the name to IC Experimental (Intercity Experimental).

Development and production
As part of the studies supported by the Federal Ministry for Research, the Bundesbahn worked with several companies to prepare a concept for a prototype of a high-speed railway system. After analysis, a train with two powercars and many coaches was projected and planned for. This concept being the basis of the project, it was supported by the ministry through a publication on the Bundesanzeiger (federal register) on 10 February 1981. The central office of the Bundesbahn in Munich evaluated various offers and tenders for cooperation till September 1981. Although the Bundesbahn had previously voted to start the development of the project immediately, the project did not begin immediately since the ministry could not completely secure the support of the industry in that time. On 6 September 1981, the required financing was secured, and the requirements to start the project were met. That was also the same day when the name of the train was changed from R/S-VD to IC Experimental. The larger plan for the project was for the manufacturing of the train to be complete by 1985, so that it could be presented to the public on the 150th anniversary of the Bundesbahn.

Originally in 1982, a train with two powercars and six coaches was planned for, one of the coaches being a measurement coach and the other five being demonstration coaches with varying interiors, totally capable of holding up to 600 passengers. As early as November 1982, the number of planned coaches was reduced to two, on grounds of costs. In March 1983, the leadership of the Bundesbahn decided to allow the development of a third coach, in order to possibly offer more seating variations, particularly the second class.

Throughout the development process, the Bundesbahn worked together with the industry, supported by the ministry. The development of technical components necessary for the development of a high-speed rail system took nearly 12 years. Parallelly under the same ministerial support programme, the support for magnetic levitation technology also took place.

The development of the train that was finally put into service began in September 1983 under the leadership of the Bundesbahn in Munich. Manufacturing started by the end of 1983, with the mechanical part of the powercars being developed and constructed by Krupp, Henschel and Krauss-Maffei. The electrical parts were developed by Siemens, AEG and Brown, Boveri & Cie. Both the parts were assimilated and finished by Friedrich Krupp in Essen (powercar 410 001) and Thyssen-Henschel in Kassel (powercar 410 002). By October 1984, the assembly and finishing of the electrical parts were ready. In January 1985, the chassis was attached to the outer hull.

The Deutsche Bahn contracted the firm Messerschmitt-Bölkow-Blohm in 1984 for the development and manufacturing of the middle coaches. The demonstration coaches 810 001-8 and 810 002-6 as well as the measuring coach 810 003-4 were built by the firm Duewag in Krefeld-Uerdingen, and finished by the firm Linke-Hofmann-Busch in Salzgitter. They were then brought to Donauwörth for the begin of the electrical set up in 1984.

The cost of construction was split between the Federal Ministry for Research (61%), DB (17%) and the involved companies (22%).

The train was delivered in 1985 and was used mainly for testing purposes for the new Intercity Express trains and as a showcase train.

The delivery of the ICE 1 powercars (now called Class 401), based on those of the ICE-V started in 1987. After that, the train was mainly used for material evaluation. The train was retired in 1998 and its powercars and cars were placed on exhibition at various sites. It was replaced by the ICE S.

References

Electric multiple units of Germany
Electric multiple units with locomotive-like power cars
Experimental and prototype high-speed trains
Intercity Express
Land speed record rail vehicles